Otis Harlan (December 29, 1865 – January 21, 1940) was an American actor and comedian. He voiced Happy, one of the Seven Dwarfs in the Disney animated film Snow White and the Seven Dwarfs.

Early years
Harlan was born in Zanesville, Ohio in 1865. He married Nellie Harvey and had a daughter named Marion. Harlan was the uncle of the silent film era leading man, Kenneth Harlan.

Career

In 1893, he appeared in Victor Herbert's The Magic Knight.  He was playing in vaudeville shows by 1911, appearing in Irving Berlin's ragtime musicals. Harlan also played the role of Cap'n Andy in the first, part-talkie film version of  "Show Boat" (1929). He was also seen as the Master of Ceremonies in the sound prologue that accompanied the film. In 1935, Harlan played the role of Starveling in Max Reinhardt's 1935 film version of Shakespeare's A Midsummer Night's Dream. In 1937, Harlan provided the voice of "Happy", one of the Seven Dwarfs in the Disney animated film Snow White and the Seven Dwarfs. In the same year he also appeared in the Our Gang short Roamin' Holiday. Contrary to popular belief, Harlan did not voice Mr. Mole in Bambi. Mr. Mole was voiced by Bambi'''s story director, Perce Pearce.

Death
Harlan died in Martinsville, Indiana, of a stroke on January 21, 1940, at the age of 74. He is buried in the Greenlawn Cemetery section of New South Park Cemetery in Martinsville, Indiana.

Selected filmographyA Black Sheep (1915) as Goodrich MuddA Stranger in New York (1916, Short) as The StrangerThe Resurrection of Dan Packard (1916)The Romance Promoters (1920) as Minor RoleThe Girl in the Taxi (1921) as Alexis
 Keeping Up with Lizzie (1921) as Sam Henshaw
 The Foolish Age (1921) as Old Top: Carr
 Diamonds Adrift (1921) as Brick McCannTwo Kinds of Women (1922) as Major LangworthyThe Right That Failed (1922) as Mr. Duffey
 Gay and Devilish (1922) as Peter Armitage (the uncle)
 The Understudy (1922) as Mr. ManningUp and at 'Em (1922) as William Jackson
 The Ladder Jinx (1922) as Thams GridleyThe Eternal Flame (1922) as Abbé ConrandWithout Compromise (1922) as Dr. Evans
 The World's a Stage (1922) as Richard Manseld Bishop
 The Spider and the Rose (1923) as The SecretaryTruxton King (1923) as HobbsMain Street (1923) as Ezra StowbodyThe Brass Bottle (1923) as Captain of the Guard
 The Victor (1923) as Chewing Gum Baron
 The Barefoot Boy (1923) as Wilson
 Pioneer Trails (1923) as 'Easy Aaron' CropseyThe Near Lady (1923) as Herman Schultz
 The Lullaby (1924) as Thomas Elliott
 The Clean Heart (1924)The Dramatic Life of Abraham Lincoln (1924) as Denton OffutGeorge Washington Jr. (1924) as Sen. HopkinsThe White Sin (1924) as Judge LangleyMademoiselle Midnight (1924) as Padre Francisco
 One Law for the Woman (1924) as Judge BlakeCode of the Wilderness (1924) as Uncle JephonWelcome Stranger (1924) as Seth TrimbleCaptain Blood (1924) as Corliss
 Code of the Wilderness (1924) as Uncle JephonThe Dixie Handicap (1924) as The Old RetainerThe Redeeming Sin (1925) as Papa chuchuOh Doctor! (1925) as Mr. ClinchHow Baxter Butted In (1925) as Amos NicholsNine and Three-Fifths Seconds (1925) as MotherbundFine Clothes (1925) as AlfredWhere Was I? (1925) as BennettLightnin' (1925) as ZebThe Limited Mail (1925) as Mr. JoffreyDollar Down (1925) as NorrisThunder Mountain (1925) as Jeff CoulterThe Perfect Clown (1925) as The BossThe Pay-Off (1926) as The Young Woman's FatherWhat Happened to Jones (1926) as Ebenezer Goodly
 Winning the Futurity (1926) as Tom GilesThe Prince of Pilsen (1926) as Bndit ChiefThe Midnight Message (1926) as Richard Macy3 Bad Men (1926) as Zach Little
 The Unknown Cavalier (1926) as Judge Blowfly JonesThe Whole Town's Talking (1926) as George SimmonnsThe Cheerful Fraud (1926) as Mr. BythewayThe Silent Rider (1927) as Sourdough JacksonDon't Tell the Wife (1927) as MagistrateDown the Stretch (1927) as Babe DilleyThe Student Prince in Old Heidelberg (1927) as Old RuderSilk Stockings (1927) as Judge FosterGalloping Fury (1927) as Pop Tully
 The Shepherd of the Hills (1928) as By ThunderGood Morning, Judge (1928) as Jerry SnootThe Grip of the Yukon (1928) as Farrell O'NeilThe Speed Classic (1928) as The Thirsty OneSilks and Saddles (1929) as Jimmy McKeeClear the Decks (1929)Show Boat (1929) as Capt. Andy HawksBroadway (1929) as 'Porky' ThompsonHis Lucky Day (1929) as Jerome Van DyneGirl Overboard (1929) as Joe Evans
 Barnum Was Right (1929) as Samuel LockeThe Mississippi Gambler (1929) as Tiny Beardsley
 Take the Heir (1930) as John WalkerEmbarrassing Moments (1930) as Adam FullerParade of the West (1930) as Professor ClaytonLoose Ankles (1930) as Major Rupert HarperDames Ahoy! (1930) as Bill JonesCaptain of the Guard (1930) as JacquesThe King of Jazz (1930) as Charles's Intended Father-in-LawMountain Justice (1930) as Jud McTavishMan to Man (1930) as Rip HenryMillie (1931) as Luke - Counterman (uncredited)Aloha (1931) as Old BenMorals for Women (1931) as Mr. JohnstonAir Eagles (1931) as Mr. RamseyThe Big Shot (1931) as Doctor PeasleePartners (1932) as AuctioneerRacing Youth (1932) as DaveThe Rider of Death Valley (1932) as PeckRide Him, Cowboy (1932) as Judge JonesNo Living Witness (1932) as Pop EverettThat's My Boy (1932) as MayorWomen Won't Tell (1932) as Henry JonesThe Telegraph Trail (1933) as Uncle Zeke KellerMister Mugg (1933, Short)Laughing at Life (1933) as Businessman #1Doctor Bull (1933) as Agitator (uncredited)
 Marriage on Approval (1933) as Justice of the Peace Michael O'ConnorsHoop-La (1933) as Town Councilman - Side Show Customer (uncredited)The Sin of Nora Moran (1933) as Mr. MoranPalooka (1934) as Doorman Riley (uncredited)Let's Talk It Over (1934) as PurserI Can't Escape (1934) as Jim BonnThe Old Fashioned Way (1934) as Mr. Wendelschaffer (uncredited)King Kelly of the U.S.A. (1934) as Prime MinisterYoung and Beautiful (1934) as Sugar Daddy (uncredited)Music in the Air (1934) as Baker (uncredited)Life Returns (1935) as Dr. HendersonThe Hoosier Schoolmaster (1935) as Squire HawkinsChinatown Squad (1935) as Dad, on Sacramento Street (uncredited)Western Frontier (1935) as CookieDiamond Jim (1935) as Drunk (uncredited)A Midsummer Night's Dream (1935) as Starveling - the TailorDr. Socrates (1935) as Fisher (uncredited)Hitch Hike Lady (1935) as Mayor LoomisThe Singing Kid (1936) as Bank Clerk (uncredited)Can This Be Dixie? (1936) as Thoma Jefferson PeachtreeRoamin' Holiday (1937, Short) as Hiram JenksWestern Gold (1937) as JakeSnow White and the Seven Dwarfs (1937) as Happy (voice, uncredited)Mr. Boggs Steps Out (1938) as Abner KatzScandal Street (1938) as Taxicab Driver (uncredited)Outlaws of Sonora (1938) as Pool playerThe Texans'' (1938) as Henry (uncredited) (final film role)

References

External links

1865 births
1940 deaths
American male film actors
American male silent film actors
American male stage actors
American male voice actors
Male actors from Ohio
Male Western (genre) film actors
People from Zanesville, Ohio
Silent film comedians
Vaudeville performers
19th-century American male actors
20th-century American male actors